Ioana Gaspar and Tatiana Perebiynis were the defending champions, but they did not compete in the Juniors this year.

Gisela Dulko and Ashley Harkleroad defeated Christina Horiatopoulos and Bethanie Mattek in the final, 6–3, 6–1 to win the girls' doubles tennis title at the 2001 Wimbledon Championships.

Seeds

  Eva Birnerová /  Petra Cetkovská (quarterfinals)
  Melissa Torres Sandoval /  Angelique Widjaja (quarterfinals)
  Gisela Dulko /  Ashley Harkleroad (champions)
  Chuang Chia-jung /  Hsieh Su-wei (second round)
  Neyssa Etienne /  Annette Kolb (second round)
  Salome Devidze /  Galina Voskoboeva (first round)
  Jelena Janković /  Matea Mezak (semifinals)
  Anna Bastrikova /  Dinara Safina (semifinals)

Draw

Finals

Top half

Bottom half

References

External links

Girls' Doubles
Wimbledon Championship by year – Girls' doubles